Christopher Michael Gronkowski (born December 26, 1986) is a former American football Fullback. He went undrafted in the 2010 NFL Draft after playing college football at the University of Arizona. He was eventually signed by the Dallas Cowboys in 2010, Indianapolis Colts in 2011, and the Denver Broncos in 2012.

He is notable for pitching his company on ABC's Shark Tank and landing a deal with Mark Cuban and Alex Rodriguez.

Early years
Gronkowski was born on December 26, 1986, in Buffalo, New York to Diane Walters and Gordon Gronkowski, who played three years as an offensive guard at Syracuse. His great-grandfather, Ignatius, was a member of the 1924 U.S. Olympic cycling team in Paris. His brothers Dan, Rob and Glenn were also in the NFL.

Football

College football
Gronkowski accepted a football scholarship from the University of Maryland, with the intention of being played at fullback. He was redshirted in 2005.

In January 2007, he transferred to the University of Arizona.  As a sophomore, he played linebacker but did not record any stat.

As a fourth year junior in 2008, he started 7 games, while making 8 receptions for 198 yards, 3 touchdowns and a team leading 24.8-yard per reception average. He served primarily as a backfield blocking specialist from the H-back position. He was named second-team Academic All-Pac-10. 

As a fifth year senior in 2009, he started 7 out of 13 games, tallying 4 catches for 20 yards and 2 carries for one yard. He was named honorable-mention Academic All-Pac-10. 

He finished his college career after starting 15 out of 26 games, collecting 12 receptions for 218 yards (18.2-yard avg.), 2 carries for one yard and 3 receiving touchdowns.

Professional football

Pre-Draft

Dallas Cowboys 
Gronkowski did not attend the NFL Scouting Combine, though his brother Rob did. He declared for the 2010 NFL Draft and was projected as high as the 4th round, but went undrafted. On April 25, he signed with the Dallas Cowboys. On September 4, he made the 53 man roster for insurance purposes in case fullback Deon Anderson's injuries persisted. He made his first career start on September 19, against the Chicago Bears. His first career touchdown catch came in the same game on a one-yard pass from Tony Romo. He became the full-time starter at fullback after Anderson was released on September 24.

On October 25, in a Monday Night Football game against the New York Giants, Gronkowski missed a blitz pickup on linebacker Michael Boley, as he ran straight to quarterback Tony Romo and hit him high. Romo got the pass off to Miles Austin, but he suffered a fractured left clavicle, which ended his season. Gronkowski was active for 14 of the 16 games and started 7 times as a rookie. He was inconsistent as a lead blocker, while posting 5 carries for 17 yards, 7 receptions for 35 yards and one touchdown. He was waived on September 3, 2011.

Indianapolis Colts
On September 4, 2011, Gronkowski was claimed off waivers by the Indianapolis Colts. On October 25, he was placed on the injured reserve list with a pectoral injury.

Denver Broncos
On May 23, 2012, Gronkowski was traded to the Denver Broncos in exchange for cornerback Cassius Vaughn. He appeared in 14 games as a backup, making one reception for 11 yards and had no rushing attempts. He wasn't re-signed after the season.

San Diego Chargers
On April 23, 2013, Gronkowski signed with the San Diego Chargers as a free agent. On August 27, he was placed on the injured reserve list with an ankle injury. On August 31, he was waived with an injury settlement.

Personal life
In July 2015, Gronkowski married Brittany Bieber. They have three sons.

After being waived by the San Diego Chargers he founded Ice Shaker, company that makes kitchen-grade stainless steel insulated bottles in 2017. Gronkowski pitched the business, with the help of his brothers, on an episode of Shark Tank. He made a deal with Mark Cuban and guest shark Alex Rodriguez for $150,000 in exchange for 15% equity. In 2018, Gronkowski stated that his company had over $3 million in sales that he attributes to the product being featured on Shark Tank.

Gronkowski is active in the family's fitness company Gronk Fitness, promoting fitness equipment sales and workout routines.

References

External links
Maryland Terrapins bio

1986 births
Living people
People from Williamsville, New York
21st-century American businesspeople
Players of American football from Buffalo, New York
American people of Polish descent
American football fullbacks
Maryland Terrapins football players
Arizona Wildcats football players
Dallas Cowboys players
Indianapolis Colts players
Denver Broncos players
San Diego Chargers players
Gronkowski family